Qeshlaq-e Aramaneh (also Romanized as Qeshlāq-e Arāmaneh) is a village in Nowjeh Mehr Rural District, Siah Rud District, Jolfa County, East Azerbaijan Province, Iran. At the 2006 census, its population was 52, in 9 families.

References 

Populated places in Jolfa County